Raymond William Collings (sometimes listed as Pennington Collings, 23 September 1908 – 13 November 1973) was a British bobsledder who competed in the late 1940s. At the 1948 Winter Olympics in St. Moritz, he finished fifth in the two-man and seventh in the four-man events.

References
1948 bobsleigh two-man results
1948 bobsleigh four-man results
British Olympic Association profile

1908 births
Olympic bobsledders of Great Britain
Bobsledders at the 1948 Winter Olympics
British male bobsledders
1973 deaths